Daniel Pool (born 1999) is a Scottish indoor bowler.

Bowls career
In 2021, Pool was selected for the Scotland under 18s squad. He is twice the World Indoor U25 Champion after winning the title at the 2022 World Indoor Bowls Championship and the 2023 World Indoor Bowls Championship. He defeated fellow Scot Darren Weir in both finals.

References

Scottish male bowls players
2000 births
Living people